Grand Slam is a baseball video game developed by Burst Studios and published by Virgin Interactive Entertainment for the Sony PlayStation, Sega Saturn, and Microsoft Windows in 1997.

Reception

The PC and PlayStation versions of Grand Slam received mostly mixed reviews. Critics agreed that the pitching and batting controls, while obviously derived from golf video games, are innovative and add a new depth of control to the baseball genre. However, they lambasted the graphics and animation, often describing them as reminiscent of the 16-bit era. Next Generation said of the PlayStation version, "Grand Slam has all the features and options in place, but ultimately can't make up for substandard graphics and slow pace." Other reactions to the selection of features and options were mixed; Darren Lerhman of GameSpot and GamePro both found that though they were generally ample, the absence of create-a-player and team licenses stood out, since most of the PlayStation version's competitors included these features. Lerhman nonetheless judged that "It may not have the team licenses, fifty years worth of statistics, or incredible graphics, but it is indeed fun (and it does have real MLB players). Suffice to say baseball fanatics will be disappointed by this title, but casual sports fans looking for an enjoyable baseball sim may find themselves willing to overlook these shortcomings." GamePros assessment was similar but more dismal: "... if you can overlook the game's faults, you'll have a pretty good time playing. But with an extraordinary game like Triple Play 98 on the market, why settle for anything less?"

Notes

References

External links
 Official website
 

1997 video games
Baseball video games
PlayStation (console) games
Sega Saturn games
Video games developed in the United States
Virgin Interactive games
Windows games